Kristin Brudevoll (born 4 January 1943) is a Norwegian organizational leader.

Early life 
On 4 January 1943, Brudevoll was born in Lillehammer, Norway.

Education 
Brudevoll studied literature at the University of Arizona, and teacher's education in Oslo.

Career 
Brudevoll is the director of the Norla (Norwegian Literature Abroad) from 1978 to 2006. Brudevoll has been a member of various committees for international cultural cooperation. She was awarded the St. Olav's Medal in 1994, and the Fritt Ord Honorary Award in 1998.

References

1943 births
Living people
People from Lillehammer
University of Arizona alumni
Norwegian expatriates in the United States
Recipients of the St. Olav's Medal